Tristan Cadija Evelyn (born 25 January 1998) is a Barbadian Olympic sprinter.

A former silver medalist at the CARIFTA Games and a student of the University of Houston, Evelyn won both the Women's 60m and the 200m at the American Athletic Conference Indoor Track and Field Championships in 2020.

Evelyn clocked a new national record time of 11.14 seconds (wind 2.0 m/s) to win gold in the women's 100 metres final at the American Athletic Conference Championship. This time also secured her place at the rescheduled 2020 Tokyo Olympics where she competed in the heats. The previous record was 11.26 seconds set by Shakera Reece in 2011. She also holds the Barbadian indoor 200m national record with a time of 23.16.

References

External links
 Houston Cougars bio

1998 births
Living people
Barbadian female sprinters
Houston Cougars women's track and field athletes
People from Saint George, Barbados
Athletes (track and field) at the 2019 Pan American Games
Pan American Games competitors for Barbados
Athletes (track and field) at the 2014 Summer Youth Olympics
Athletes (track and field) at the 2020 Summer Olympics
Olympic female sprinters
Olympic athletes of Barbados